Ben Brielmaier (born October 24, 1983) is a former American football offensive tackle. He was signed by the Cleveland Browns as an undrafted free agent in 2006. He played college football at Princeton.

He has also been a member of the Frankfurt Galaxy, Toronto Argonauts, and Las Vegas Locomotives.

Early years
Brielmaier played high school football at Loyola Catholic School in Mankato, Minnesota.

College career
Ben attended Princeton University, graduating in 2006 with a BSE (Bachelor of Science in engineering) in Electrical Engineering.  His focus and specialty was Solid State Devices.

Professional career

Cleveland Browns
Brielmaier signed as an undrafted free agent with the Cleveland Browns of the NFL on May 8, 2006. He was released on July 30.

Frankfurt Galaxy
Brielmaier signed as a free agent with the Frankfurt Galaxy of NFL Europa and played in every game of the 2007 season.

Toronto Argonauts
Brielmaier signed with the Toronto Argonauts of the Canadian Football League on April 10, 2008. He was released during training camp on June 14.

References

External links
Las Vegas Locomotives bio
Princeton Tigers bio
Just Sports Stats

1983 births
Living people
Sportspeople from Mankato, Minnesota
Players of American football from Minnesota
American football offensive tackles
Princeton Tigers football players
Frankfurt Galaxy players
Las Vegas Locomotives players